Araucanian islands may refer to:

Mocha Island
Quiriquina Island
Santa María Island